Leroy Houston, (born 10 November 1986) is an Australian professional rugby union player. He currently plays for Biarritz Olympique in the Rugby Pro D2. He played for the Queensland Reds in Super Rugby and previously played in France, in the Pro D2 for US Colomiers, before playing for Bath Rugby in the Aviva Premiership.

Early life
Houston was born in Levin, New Zealand and spent his early years in Shannon  before moving to Australia with his family in 2000. Houston was educated at Asquith Boys High School in Sydney.

Career
Houston originally played for the New South Wales Waratahs from 2005 where he was picked to tour with the Wallabies, he also played for Australia A before playing a Super 14 game.

Houston took time off from rugby in 2007 and eventually decided to sign with the Queensland Reds for the 2008 Super 14 season, receiving the Rookie of the Year Award. Houston made his debut for Queensland in a pre-season trial against his old club the Waratahs.

In February 2013, it was announced that Houston would join English Premiership side Bath Rugby from US Colomiers for the 2013/14 season.

Houston Left Bath to re-join Queensland Reds in the Summer of 2016 with hopes of furthering his international career. Following the end of the Reds season Houston resigned for Bath on a short-term deal. Houston scored the final try in his first match back for Bath, a 37–22 victory over Worcester Warriors.

International

In 2016, Houston was named in the Wallabies preliminary 39-man squad for the 2016 series against England after it was announced that he would be returning to the Queensland Reds, but he had to wait another four months until October that year to make his test debut, coming off the bench to replace Lopeti Timani against  in London for the final match of the 2016 Rugby Championship.

References

External links
 Club Stats on It's Rugby
 

Australian rugby union players
Rugby union number eights
New Zealand emigrants to Australia
1986 births
Living people
Queensland Reds players
New South Wales Waratahs players
Bath Rugby players
Union Bordeaux Bègles players
People from Levin, New Zealand
Expatriate rugby union players in France
Expatriate rugby union players in England
Australia international rugby union players
Rugby union players from Manawatū-Whanganui
Australian expatriate sportspeople in England
Australian expatriate sportspeople in France
US Colomiers players
Biarritz Olympique players